Christopher Wilkinson (born March 29, 1950) is an American screenwriter, producer, and director. He was nominated for an Academy Award for Best Original Screenplay for Nixon (1995). He also wrote the screenplays for Ali (2001) and Copying Beethoven (2006), the latter of which he also produced. Most of his scripts are historically based and co-written with Stephen J. Rivele.

Early life and education
Wilkinson was born in New York City and raised in Philadelphia. He began his career as a musician before attending film school at Temple University.

Career
Wilkinson has written several biopics with frequent writing partner Stephen J. Rivele, starting with Nixon (1995) and including Ali (2001) and Copying Beethoven (2006). He was a writer and executive producer on Pawn Sacrifice (2014) and Miles Ahead (2015), and wrote and directed the PBS film Virtuosity (2014).

Wilkinson worked on the screenplays for Mercury, a biopic about Queen lead singer Freddie Mercury, the long-planned All Eyez on Me, about rapper Tupac Shakur, and Birth of the Dragon, inspired by the real-life no-rules fight between Bruce Lee and Chinese kung fu master Wong Jack Man.

Personal life
Wilkinson lives in Los Angeles, California, with his son. He was formerly married to cartoonist Cathy Guisewite (creator of the comic strip Cathy).

Filmography
 Echoes (1980) - writer/director/producer
 Engine 2, Ladder 3 (1982) - writer/director/producer
 The River (1984) - second unit director
 Nuts (1987) - writer (uncredited)
 Penrod (1990) - writer/director/producer
 Nobody's Home (1990) - writer/director/producer
 For the Boys (1991) - second unit director/associate producer
 Intersection (1994) - second unit director/post-production supervisor
 Nixon (1995) - writer
 Ali (2001) - writer
 Copying Beethoven (2006) - writer/producer
 Virtuosity (2014) - writer/director/producer
 Pawn Sacrifice (2014) - writer/executive producer
 Miles Ahead (2015) - writer/executive producer
 Birth of the Dragon (2016) - writer/producer
 All Eyez on Me (2017) - writer
 Gemini Man (2019) - co-writer

References

External links

American male screenwriters
Film producers from New York (state)
1950 births
Living people
Temple University alumni
Film directors from New York City
Film directors from Pennsylvania
Screenwriters from New York (state)